Patsy Cline is an EP released by American country music singer, Patsy Cline on August 14, 1961. It Cline's third EP to be released.

This was Cline's second EP to be self-titled. The EP contained two songs Cline had recorded under her last session from Four Star Records ("There He Goes" and "Lovesick Blues") and two new songs recorded under new label, Decca Records ("I Fall to Pieces" and "Lovin' in Vain"). At the time of its release, Cline had released "I Fall to Pieces" as a single, where it had already reached #1 on the Billboard Country chart, and eventually #12 on the Pop chart. Two months prior, she had been involved in a serious automobile accident, therefore and album could not be released. Instead, Decca issued her first EP, containing "I Fall to Pieces." 

The cover photograph was provided by photographer, Les Leverett.

Track listing
Side 1:
"I Fall to Pieces" — (Hank Cochran, Harlan Howard) 2:47
"Lovin' in Vain" — (Freddie Hart) 2:14

Side 2:
"Lovesick Blues" — (Cliff Friend, Irving Mills) 2:25
"There He Goes" — (Durwood Haddock, Eddie Miller, W.S. Stevenson) 2:25

Personnel
All recording sessions took place at Bradley Film and Music Studios in Nashville, Tennessee, United States.

 Harold Bradley — 6-string electric bass
 Patsy Cline — lead vocals
 Floyd Cramer — piano
 Jimmy Day — steel guitar
 Hank Garland — electric guitar
 Buddy Harman — drums
 Randy Hughes — acoustic guitar
 The Jordanaires — background vocals
 Ben Keith — steel guitar
 Doug Kirkham — drums
 Grady Martin — electric guitar, fiddle
 Bob Moore — acoustic bass
 Hargus "Pig" Robbins — piano

References

Patsy Cline EPs
1961 EPs
Decca Records EPs